William Lawrence Merry (December 27, 1835 in New York– December 14, 1911) was an American ambassador to Costa Rica, El Salvador, and Nicaragua.

Merry was the first U.S. Minister to be resident in San Jose.

References

External links
 
 

1835 births
1911 deaths
Ambassadors of the United States to Costa Rica
Ambassadors of the United States to Nicaragua
Ambassadors of the United States to El Salvador